Lehlohonolo Moromella (born 1985) is a Basotho swimmer.

Career
Moromella competed for Lesotho at the 2007 World Championships in Melbourne where he finished 122nd in the 50 metre breaststroke in 42.93, 175th in the 50 metre freestyle in 38.06 and with Thabiso Baholo, Boipelo Makhothi and Seele Benjamin Ntai finished 29th in the 4 × 100 metre freestyle relay in 5:42.96.

References

1985 births
Living people
Lesotho male swimmers
Male backstroke swimmers
Lesotho male freestyle swimmers
Date of birth missing (living people)